Hurricane Baker was a Category 2 hurricane that affected the Leeward Islands, Greater Antilles, and the Gulf Coast of the United States. The tropical cyclone was the second tropical storm and second hurricane of the 1950 Atlantic hurricane season. Originating as a tropical depression east of the Windward Islands on August 18, Baker became a tropical storm on August 19, and further intensified into a hurricane on August 21. Baker weakened to a tropical depression late on August 23 while southwest of Puerto Rico. By the following morning, it had restrengthened into a tropical storm, though a landfall in Cuba caused it to weaken once again. Entering the Gulf of Mexico, Baker began to strengthen once more, regaining hurricane strength on August 29 and reaching its peak intensity with maximum sustained winds of  early the following day. Hurricane Baker produced extensive damage in the Lesser Antilles and Cuba, but impacts were minimal in the United States.

Meteorological history
The tropical storm deepened to hurricane intensity. On August 22, it lost intensity and weakened to a tropical storm. On August 23, Baker made landfall near the Puerto Rican town of Guánica as a minimal tropical storm. The storm then degenerated into an easterly tropical wave, and moved west-northwestward over northeastern Hispaniola. On August 24, it re-entered the Atlantic Ocean, and Tropical Depression Baker crossed the coast of eastern Cuba early on the next day.

On August 25, Baker redeveloped a center over the Caribbean Sea off southern Cuba, and re-intensified to tropical storm status. On August 27, Baker affected the Pinar del Río Province with  winds, and then turned northward over the southern Gulf of Mexico. The cyclone diminished in intensity prior to landfall. On August 31, the hurricane struck Gulf Shores, Alabama as a Category 1 hurricane with sustained winds estimated near . Baker moved inland over Alabama and dissipated over southeastern Missouri on September 1.

Impact

On Antigua, the Pan American Airways station's power failed when winds reached  around midnight on August 22. Subsequent reports indicated light damage occurred on the island; later, information from the island indicated extensive damage. More than 100 homes were destroyed or damaged in the Willkie and Piggott areas, and large homes were destroyed in Prestown. Additionally, a manse was also demolished in Prestown. Electronic communications were dismantled, and thousands of homeless people sheltered in churches and schools. No deaths occurred on the island, but damages were expected to reach several thousand dollars. In Cuba, 37 people died, and the property losses reached several million dollars.

In the United States, the greatest property and crop damage occurred from Mobile, Alabama to Saint Marks, Florida, where losses approached $2,550,000 (1950 USD); high tides and winds inflicted minimal damage in both cities. Peak gusts exceeded  on Santa Rosa Island, Florida. 200 to 300 cottages received damage in Panama City, and homes were flooded near the bay. Losses reached $200,000 (1950 USD) in Gulf Shores, Alabama. Hurricane Baker spawned two tornadoes. On August 30, a F1 tornado touched down in Apalachicola, Florida, destroying four dwellings and a store building and damaging another eleven buildings. On August 31, a F0 tornado demolished one building near Marianna, Florida, in Jackson County. Inland, Birmingham International Airport recorded  wind gusts; higher gusts were estimated near  in elevated, mountainous locations. Hundreds of trees were prostrated as far north as the Birmingham, Alabama area, and one person was killed and two more injured by live wires falling from utility poles.

See also

List of Category 2 Atlantic hurricanes
List of Florida hurricanes
List of United States hurricanes
List of Atlantic hurricanes

Notes

Further reading
Barnes, Jay (1998). Florida's Hurricane History. Chapel Hill Press. .

1950 Atlantic hurricane season
Category 3 Atlantic hurricanes
Baker
Baker
Baker
Baker
Baker
Baker
Baker
Baker
Baker
Baker
Baker
Baker
Hurricane Baker
Hurricane Baker
1950 in the Caribbean
1950 in Saint Kitts-Nevis-Anguilla